The Global Combat Air Programme (GCAP) is a multinational initiative led by the United Kingdom, Japan, and Italy to develop a sixth-generation stealth fighter. The programme aims to replace the Eurofighter Typhoon in service with the Royal Air Force and the Italian Air Force, and the Mitsubishi F-2 in service with the Japan Air Self-Defense Force. On 9 December 2022, the governments of Japan, the United Kingdom, and Italy jointly announced that they would develop and deploy a common fighter jet, merging their previously separate sixth-generation projects: the United Kingdom-led BAE Systems Tempest, and the Japanese Mitsubishi F-X.  At the end of December 2022, Japan and Sweden signed an agreement on possible future cooperation.

Development
Discussions to combine efforts on Tempest with Japan's own F-X fighter project as a means to cut development costs began as early as 2017. The final decision made towards the end of 2022 to merge the development and deployment of a common fighter jet under a project called the "Global Combat Air Program" (GCAP) with development shared with Italy. The jet is expected to also be designed for additional export markets to further reduce the per-unit costs.

Contractors
The programme is envisaged as an equal partnership between the member nations. In the UK, BAE Systems will act as prime contractor and handle the airframe, Rolls-Royce the engines, Leonardo's UK division the electronics, and MBDA UK the weapons. In Japan, Mitsubishi Heavy Industries will act as prime contractor, with IHI Corporation handling the engines, and Mitsubishi Electric handling the electronics. In Italy, Leonardo S.p.A. will be prime contractor, with Avio Aero working on the engines, and MBDA will also work on missile development.

Programme timeline
By around 2024, detailed development and cost sharing for each company will be clarified, and production will begin around 2030, with the first aircraft to be deployed in 2035.

See also
 Next Generation Air Dominance (NGAD)
 F/A-XX 
 Future Combat Air System (FCAS)

References

Stealth aircraft
Proposed aircraft of the United Kingdom
Proposed aircraft of Italy
United Kingdom military aircraft procurement program